Message for the Masses is the second independent album recorded by Sanctus Real. The tracks "Message for the Masses", and "After Today" were re-recorded for the album Nothing to Lose. "Message for the Masses" was re-titled "Message". Both tracks were redone again for later albums. The track "After Today" was ultimately re-recorded for the album Say it Loud, and the track "Message" was ultimately re-recorded for the album Fight the Tide.

Track listing
"One of the Best" – 3:01
"Waiver" – 4:14
"Never Leave" – 2:44
"Free to Be" – 4:43
"Forever and a Day" – 4:01
"Remedy" – 4:49
"After Today" – 5:46
"Message for the Masses" – 4:18 – (An early version of "Message")
"S.O.S." – 3:04
"Recognized" – 4:11
"So Long" – 5:45
"Coffee of Life" – 2:37

Personnel
Matt Hammit – Lead vocals, Rhythm guitar
Chris Rohman – Lead guitars
Mark Graalman – Drums and Percussion
Matt Kollar – Bass

Production
Recorded at Waveburner Studio
Engineered & Mastered by Dalton Brand
Produced by Sanctus Real
Photography – Jim Rohman
Graphic Art – Jeff Frye
Cover – Matt Hammit
Management – Jessica Lardinais

1999 albums
Sanctus Real albums
Self-released albums